Olaf Bryn Kullmann (2 July 1892 – 9 July 1942) was a Norwegian naval officer and peace activist.

Early life and career
He was born in Stord in the county of Hordaland, Norway. He was a son of vicar and school manager Jakob Kullmann (1852–1910) and Ingeleiv Kristine Mæland (1864–1951). He studied at the Norwegian Naval Academy, and served on a torpedo boat with the rank of Premier Lieutenant from 1916. He later studied law, graduated with the Candidate of Law degree in 1923, served as a deputy in Vestfold, and from 1925 was an attorney in Bergen. From 1925 to 1930 he worked in Oslo. He then returned to the navy, from 1929 with the rank of Captain. He had responsibility for the torpedo battery at Oscarsborg Fortress.

Political turnaround
Kullmann eventually turned against the ideas of the existing military. He had been an adviser for the Norwegian Labour Party when in 1932 it proposed to replace the entire armed forces with a semi-armed "civil guard", and was a member of the party for some time. In the summer of 1932 he participated on an anti-war congress in Amsterdam. For his agitation, Kullmann was suspended and legally relieved of his naval engagements. The campaign was spearheaded by then-Minister of Defence Vidkun Quisling, and a support campaign for Kullmann was spearheaded by the Labour Party. Kullmann also formed a short-lived Peace Party.

The latter half of the 1930s started with the Second Italo-Abyssinian War, which Kullmann protested. For this he was expelled from Italy, where he had travelled in 1935. He issued the book Hjelp din bror, etioperen ("Help Your Brother, the Ethiopian") in Norway in 1938. In 1940, Norway was invaded by Germany, involving Norway in World War II. Kullmann subsequently bicycled around Norway to agitate for pacifism.

Incarceration and death
The German occupiers demanded his signature on a declaration that he would forever cease his pacifist agitation; Kullmann refused and was arrested in June 1941. He was imprisoned in Møllergata 19 and Grini concentration camp before being sent to Sachsenhausen concentration camp on Good Friday, 3 April 1942, and died there in July. He was memorialized in a poem by fellow Sachsenhausen inmate Arnulf Øverland in the 1956 poetry collection Sverdet bak døren.

Kullmann was a granduncle of later Norwegian Nobel Committee member Kaci Kullmann Five.

Selected works
 Fred eller krig for Norden? (1935)
 Europe Awake (1936)
 Hjelp din bror, etioperen (1938)
 Folkereisning mot krig (1939)
 Lovsangen (1940)

References

Other sources
Gjelsvik, Tore (1979) Norwegian Resistance: 1940–1945 (Univ of Toronto Press) 
Ottosen, Kristian (1990) Liv og død : historien om Sachsenhausen-fangene (Oslo: Aschehoug)  

1892 births
1942 deaths
Royal Norwegian Naval Academy alumni
Royal Norwegian Navy personnel
Resistance members killed by Nazi Germany
Norwegian anti-war activists
20th-century Norwegian lawyers
Norwegian resistance members
People who died in Sachsenhausen concentration camp
Grini concentration camp prisoners
Military personnel who died in Nazi concentration camps
People from Stord